Cherkasy is a city in central Ukraine. Cherkasy is the capital of Cherkasy Oblast (province), as well as the administrative center of Cherkasky Raion (district) within the oblast. The city has a population of 

Cherkasy is the cultural, educational and industrial center of Cherkasy Oblast and Central Economical Region of Ukraine. Cherkasy has been known since the 13th century and played a great role in the history of Ukraine. The city was the center of the land of the Cossacks; its citizens took part in Khmelnychchyna and Koliyivschyna (cossacks' and peasants' rebellions).

Cherkasy is divided into 2 boroughs (raions): Sosnivskiy (with Orshanets village) and Pridniprovskiy. It hosts the administration of Cherkasy urban hromada, one of the hromadas of Ukraine. In June 2011, the city celebrated its 725th anniversary.

Environment

Location 
Cherkasy is situated on the high right bank of the Dnipro River, in the middle of the Kremenchuk Reservoir. Relief of the historical part of the city was influenced by Zamkova (Castle) mountain, where Cherkasy Castle was situated. The major part of Cherkasy occurs as lowlands.

The city's length is  along the Kremenchuk Reservoir, while its widest point is only .

From the north-west, Cherkasy is surrounded by forest. Known as Cherkaskiy Bir, it is the biggest natural pine forest in Ukraine.

Climate 

The climate of Cherkasy is mild continental, with mild winters and warm summers.

Winters are usually cold and snowy (the average January temperature is ). Summers are dry and warm (the average temperature in July is ), with occasional highs reaching .

Ecology 
The ecological situation in the city is quite stable. The cumulative pollution index  is 7.56, average with other Ukrainian cities. The main pollutant in the city is "Azot" plant, so the nearby area (south-east part of the city) is the most polluted. The downtown area is heavily polluted as well, due to high traffic volume. The city itself is mostly clean of nuclear pollution from the Chernobyl disaster, although the northernmost part of Cherkasy may have been influenced a little.

Demographics 
According to the newest data, the number of inhabitants of Cherkasy is 284,479 as of 1 October 2015. This number is decreasing because of rising mortality rate, socio-economic situation, and the suburbanisation process in the region.

This diagram shows the changes of population in Cherkasy:

The majority of citizens are Ukrainians, with a large population of Russians and Jews. 46.4% are males, 53.6% are females. According to the data provided by the municipal health care department, teens under 14 encompass 15% of the population while pensioners are 19%, which indicates the prevalence of aging citizens as compared to younger citizens.

History

Early history 
The history of Cherkasy has not been thoroughly explored. The year of establishment is considered by historians to be 1286 on the Kyivan Rus territory. There are few facts about the beginning of the city, but it is documented that Cherkasy existed in the 14th century. The first record about Cherkasy dates from 1305 in the Gustynskiy Chronicle, which is the Kyivan Rus chronicle. The city is mentioned as an existing city among other Kyivan Rus cities, including Kyiv, Kaniv, Zhytomyr and Ovruch.

The city became one of the centers of the Cossack movement. Citizens took part in the Khmelnychchyna of 1648-1657 and in the Koliyivschyna of 1768–1769. The city was influenced by the cruel social and economical experiments of Soviet authorities and by World War II. In 1954 Cherkasy became the administrative center of Cherkasy Oblast (province), the youngest oblast of Ukraine.

Under the Grand Duchy of Lithuania 

In the 1360s the city entered a new period in its development, becoming a part of the Grand Duchy of Lithuania. Cherkasy became an important defender of the southern borders of the Grand Duchy. In 1384 the city was recognized as a fortified town on the southern edge (of the Grand Duchy of Lithuania), forming along with Vinnytsia, Bratslav and Kaniv part of a defensive line against Crimean Tatars. The city started to be ruled by a headman (starosta).

During the 15th and 16th centuries Cherkasy was one of the main centers that helped the Cossacks in the peopling of the Ukrainian south. Citizens took part in military campaigns against Tatars and Turks, including operations led by Ivan Pidkova (died 1578). New Cherkasy Castle, built in 1549–52 on the place of the old one, was the center of city life.

Under Polish rule, Khmelnytsky Uprising 

After the Union of Lublin in 1569 Cherkasy became a part of Poland. Cherkasy Regiment, which was created in 1625, played a big role in history of the city. During the Khmelnytsky Uprising the regiment became administrative-territorial subdivision (until 1686). During that time Cherkasy's Regiment was one of the most powerful military units and took part in all of the battles for Bohdan Khmelnytsky army. After a successful campaign, Khmelnytsky in 1654 signed an alliance with Muscovy at Pereyaslav.  The war ended in 1667 with the Truce of Andrusovo. Cherkasy remained part of Poland, but territories east of the Dnieper River including left-bank Ukraine and Zaporizhia were secured for Muscovy.
While in the Polish Kingdom the city was a seat of the county (powiat) which belonged to a greater unit – the Kyiv Voivodeship of the Lesser Poland Province until 1793. In 1768 during the Koliyivshchyna turmoils the city was severely damaged and pillaged. In 1791 the city gained Magdeburg rights. It was a royal city of Poland. After the Second Partition of Poland the city was incorporated into the Kyivan Guberniya of Imperial Russia.

19th – early 20th centuries 

Since the beginning of the 19th century the city was planned by Russian architect, civil engineer and town planner of Scottish descent, William Heste. After the second division of Poland in 1793, Cherkasy became part of the Russian Empire. From 1797 it was a  town of Kyiv Governorate. In the second half of the 19th century the city experienced a great economical growth. After the railroad appeared in the city, a lot of new industrial enterprises were built. Sugar, tobacco, metalwork, mechanical engineering and trade industries were at peak development at that time. Architect William Heste made a general development plan for the city, which involved building square blocks with straight streets.

20th century (Soviet era) 

After the October revolution in 1917 Cherkasy fell under Bolshevik control. After that, however, the city changed its ruler at least 18 times – during the civil war it was conquered by hetman Pavlo Skoropadskyi, then again by Bolsheviks, later by Nykyfor Hryhoriv. On 1 January 1920, the city finally and for a long period fell under Soviet rule. As with all villages and towns in the area, it was a victim of man-made famine in 1932–1933 (Holodomor) and a Great Purge (a series of campaigns of political repression and persecution in the Soviet Union organised by Joseph Stalin in 1936–1938).

The Second World War damaged the city greatly. On 22 June 1941, German bombers attacked Cherkasy. For two months soldiers defended the city, but on 22 August, the invaders took the city. On 14 December 1943, Cherkasy was liberated from the German invaders. After the end of the war, the city began to recover after being almost obliterated. According to 5-year plans, the city began to re-develop its economy, infrastructure and socio-cultural sphere. In 1954 the city became the administrative center of Cherkasy Oblast (province), the youngest among other oblasts in Ukraine. In the 1960s Cherkasy became the chemical giant of the Ukrainian SSR, after "Azot" (the biggest nitrogen fertilizer producing plant), "Himvolokno" (artificial fiber manufacturing plant), "Himreaktyv" (chemical reagents for military purposes) and many others were built in the city. In 1961 a Kremenchuk hydro power plant was built, forming the Kremenchuk Water Reservoir, which Cherkasy is now standing on. This makes the city a big transport hub, serving the longest dyke in Ukraine (15 km) with rail and road on it.

Independence from the Soviet Union 
Since gaining independence, industry in the city has declined, along with the number of citizens and living standards. A lot of big and powerful factories and plants were privatized but couldn't survive in a competitive market. Some enterprises changed their profile – several (3) factories and plants around the city were united under the "Bogdan Corporation" and started production of buses and cars. Some of the companies remained working and became successful, like "Azot".
On 28 November 2008, the monument of Lenin was removed from the central square. This caused different reactions in different people. Now the central square, formerly called "Lenin Square", is called "Soborna Square" (Cathedral Square). The square was recently renovated.
In 2009, Cherkasy airport received International Airport status (IATA: CKC – ICAO: UKKE).

Until 18 July 2020, Cherkasy was designated as a city of oblast significance and belonged to Cherkasy Municipality but not to Cherkasy Raion even though it was the center of the raion. As part of the administrative reform of Ukraine, which reduced the number of raions of Cherkasy Oblast to four, the city was merged into Cherkasy Raion.

Transportation

Public transportation 
Public transportation is represented by trolleybuses and buses. Trolleybuses started serving the city in 1965, and now are operating on 10 routes, from approximately 6 am till 11 pm. The fleet is old, and mostly consists of ZiU-9 and ZiU-10 vehicles. Recently, 3 new trolleybuses (manufactured by LAZ) appeared in the city. Buses are mostly represented with "Etalon", "Bohdan", and "PAZ" buses. Cherkasy City Bus is the authority that controls the buses in the city, it consists of several private contractors which actually operate the transport system.

Roads 

Cherkasy is a big transport hub due to its location in the center of the country.
Two major automobile routes go through the city –  H16  (Uman-Zolotonosha, national route) and  P10  (Kaniv-Kremenchuk, regional route). There is a 4-lane highway between Cherkasy and Smila (which is a part of Cherkasy Urban Agglomeration). The roads are in poor technical condition and road maintenance is poor.

Railways 

The city has a railway station and one railway stop, both are operated by the state-owned Ukrzaliznytsia company. Cherkasy has regular connections to neighbouring cities with small diesel trains. Major route Odessa-Moscow passes through Cherkasy.

Air and Water transport 
As Cherkasy is located on the bank of Kremenchuk reservoir, it has a small riverport. The previously extensive riverboat service along the Dnieper featuring the Raketa hydrofoil ships no longer exists, limiting river transport to cargo and tour boats and private pleasure craft. There is also a cargo port located in the city.

Cherkasy International Airport is located on the western edge of the city. It handles chartered flights around Ukraine, because Boryspil airport in Kyiv handles most of Ukraine's International flights. In addition, Cherkasy airport is used as the alternative airport for Boryspil in case of unforeseen situations and adverse weather conditions.

Economy 
Cherkasy is an important economic center of Ukraine. The city is presented with different industries, but traditionally the greatest development was reached in chemical industry, automotive industry and food industry. Total yield, generated by Cherkasy industries was near UAH 7,894.3 billion that is 64% of total income of Cherkasy Region.

Main industry enterprises of Cherkasy:

 Chemical industry: JSC "AZOT" (chemical fertilizers production), plant "Aurora" (paints and varnishes production), LLC "Cherkasy Autochemical Plant".
 Light industry: Silk combine "Cherkasy Silk combine", shoe factory "Laventa", sewing factory, named by Lesia Ukrainka, producer of medical and personal care products of cotton-gauze «Vatfarm» Ltd.
 Mechanical engineering: JSC "CherkasyElevatorMash", 3 plants of "Bogdan" corporation – a car assembling plant ("Hyundai" assembling), a truck assembling plant ("Isuzu" assembling) and a bus construction plant ("Bogdan" assembling), JSC "Temp" (production of food industry equipment), "Photoprylad" (optical parts producing).
 Food industry: distillery LLC "Buasson-Elit" Belvedere Group, corn-processing and milling plant LLC "Altera Azteka Milling Ukraine", milk-processing plant JSC "Iuria", confectionery "Svit Lasoschiv", meat processing plant "ChPK", mechanized bakery LLC "CherkasyKhlib".
 Timber and furniture industry: LLC "Marelli", furniture factories "Romira" and "PM-plus".
 IT business: uCoz, InfoLand, In-Agro, QATestLab, SPD-Ukraine, ChallengeSoft.
 Internet-providers: McLaut, Fregat, Volia-cable, Ukrtelecom.

Education 

Nowadays there are different types of educational institutions in Cherkasy – pre-school (kindergartens), schools, out-of-school and higher educational institutions. These institutions may be both state-owned and private property.

Pre-school education is represented with 50 kindergartens around the city.

City-owned schools are 21 general schools, 1 night school, and 14 new-type schools – 2 lyceums, 3 gymnasiums, collegiate, 8 specialized schools. This include First City Gymnasium, City Gymnasium No. 9 and No. 31, Cherkasy Physical and Mathematical Lyceum, Cherkasy Lyceum of Humanities and Law, Specialized School No. 17 (Associated UNESCO school), Cherkasy Collegiate "Beregynia", Specialized Schools No. 3, #13, No. 18, #20, No. 27, #28 and No. 33.
Private schools are "Perlyna", school No. 770, and "Sofia".

Out-of-school institutions are Center of Youth Art, Young Sailors Club, Center of Tourism and Sports.

There is a number of post-secondary educational institutions:

 The Bohdan Khmelnytsky National University of Cherkasy
 Cherkasy State Technological University
 Cherkasy Institute of Bank Affairs (branch of Ukrainian Academy of Bank Affairs of National Bank of Ukraine)
 Academy of fire safety of Heroes of Chornobyl
 East European University of Economics and Management (private)
 Odessa National Law Academy (branch)

There is a number of colleges (both state and private):
 Cherkasy Medical College
 Cherkasy State Business College
 Cherkasy Commercial Technical School
 Cherkasy Musical College
 Cherkasy Cooperative Economics and Law College

Several public libraries are serving the city – Central Library of Lesia Ukrainka, City Library for Youth and Children, Central Oblast Library of Taras Shevchenko.

Culture and recreation 
Cherkasy is a big cultural center. Several theaters, philharmonic, 3 movie theaters, numerous museums and clubs are serving the city. The city has 3 indoor skating rinks. People can relax in big parks and gardens around the city, they can also visit city's zoo. Cherkasy is among the cities in Ukraine that have their own planetarium.

Museums 

The biggest museums of Cherkasy are:
Cherkasy Oblast Local History Museum – the collection of artifacts from the history, nature, culture, and ethnography of Cherkasy Oblast.
"Kobzar" Museum of Taras Shevchenko – the only museum in the world about one book.
Cherkasy Art Museum – big museum where different exhibitions are held throughout the year.
Cherkasy Literary Memorial Museum of Vasyl Symonenko.
Cherkasy Museum of Vyshyvanka

Theaters and music 

There are several theaters in Cherkasy, such as:
Taras Shevchenko Ukrainian Academic Drama Theatre of Cherkasy
Cherkasy Academic Puppet Theater
Youth Theater "Suchasnyk"
The city has its own philharmonic, which was created in 1955. The big cultural center is concert hall "Druzhba Narodiv" (Friendship of Nations), where all major concerts are held. Besides, there are numerous local cultural clubs.

The city has 4 modern movie theaters – "Salut" (a very old building, was the first cinema in Cherkasy), "Ukraine",  "Dnipro Plaza" and "Lubava".

Recreation 

Cherkasy is famous as a green city. The main parks are Park Peremohy (Victory Park) with a zoo, Sobornyi Park (Cathedral Park), Juvileyniy Park (Jubilee Park), Park Himikiv (Park of Chemists), Dolyna Troiand (Rose Valley), and two children's parks.
Traditional places of summer recreation are beaches of Dnipro River. Infrastructure of the beaches is under development right now, although several recreational complexes are already built.
On the northern end of the city, in Cherkasy Forest, sanatorium "Ukraine" is situated, along with three-star hotel "Ukraine", and "Kosmos-Bowling" club. There are also several hotels in the city which can accommodate people with different tastes.

Festivals 

The city is famous for its sculpture festivals – "Kryzhtal" (held in winter, sculptures are made of ice), "Drevlyandia" (held in summer, sculptures are made of wood, then placed in parks around the city), and "Zhyvyi Kamin" (held in autumn, sculptures are made of stone). Along with the last, "Cherkasy's Singing Nights" are held in the open-air theater in park. Since 2003, Cherkasy hosts international bike festival "Tarasova Gora", which gathers bikers from Ukraine, Russia, and other European countries. This is the biggest festival of this kind held in Ukraine.

The city also hosts a music festival (sponsored by Pentax-Richo), that takes the name "Takumar5555", that is the old Pentax brand name, and a play on the city's 55th year of independence.

Mass media 
Cherkasy is a big media market, which is served by several local TV stations, newspapers, and numerous radio stations.

The city is a home to numerous newspapers, among which are "Antenna", "Molod' Cherkashchyny", "Vechirni Cherkasy", "Akcent", "Nova Doba", "Misto", "Cherkasky Kray" etc.

Cherkasy has 5 TV stations – Vikka, Antenna-Plus, Media-Center, Expo-TV, and state-owned Ros'. The city is also covered with nationwide channel broadcasting, like 1+1, Inter, ICTV, STB, TET etc. .

City's radio stations are mostly nationwide networks broadcast on local frequencies, although some local stations exist. FM radio stations include KISS FM, Hit FM, Radio Luks, Radio Rocks, Shanson, Ros', Era FM, Love Radio, 101Dalmatin, Dobre Radio.

Sports 

Sport life of the city is concentrated in several places, among which are the Central Stadium, Water Sport station, Sport Center "Spartak", "Ukraine"; Sport arena "Budivel'nyk"; "Astra", "Central", "Sokil" swimming pools; 2 ice rinks. Also, there are sport-entertainment centers, such as "Selena", "Bochka", and "Sportohota" which can usually be found on the bank of the Dnipro River.

Every year more than 200 sport events, contests, competitions, tournaments are held in the city, with total of 10,000 participants. Some contests that were held recently include:
The European Women's Powerlifting Championships in 1998 saw lifters from across Europe.
Ukrainian Aquabike Cup in 2008 hosted bikers from Cherkasy, Odessa, Kyiv, and former Dnipropetrovsk. It was held in "Bochka" entertainment center.
Kremenchuk Reservoir Cup – yacht contest among cities located on Kremenchuk Reservoir. Hosted 27 teams from Svitlovodsk, Kremenchuk, Cherkasy, and Komsomolsk.
Ukrainian Beach Volleyball Championship – was held in 2008 on the courts of "Rybka" complex
Group 2 Euro/Africa Zone matches of 2008 Davis Cup were held in Cherkasy, in "Selena" sport complex.

Other sport achievements are:
Cherkasy is home to the soccer club FC Dnipro Cherkasy
Cherkasy is home to the basketball club BC Cherkasy (a.k.a. the Cherkasy Monkeys).
Cherkasy is home to the volleyball clubs Krug Cherkasy, Zlatogor Zolotonosha Cherkasy (women) and Impexagro Sport Cherkasy (men). They all play in the European tournaments 2008/2009.
Cherkasy is represented within Ukrainian Bandy and Rink-bandy Federation.

Architecture and sights 

During its whole history Cherkasy was destroyed and rebuilt numerous times. Only few buildings from the 19th century survived. The system of streets and squares in the old part of the city is one of the few monuments to the city-building art of 19th century Ukraine.
Scherbina House (Wedding Palace). It was the most luxurious mansion of prerevolutionary Cherkasy. In Soviet times it was known as the "Palace of Happiness" because it was city's registry office. The house was built by entrepreneur A. Scherbina in 1892. From 1970 to the present day the building is used as the Wedding Palace (civil registry agency).
The building of former hotel "Slavyanskiy". It was constructed in the late 19th century by means of an entrepreneur Skoryna in a modernist style with elements of pseudo. In Soviet times it was a hotel "Dnepr". Today the building belongs to "Ukrsotsbank".
Tsybulsky House (Museum of Kobzar). This historic building locate in the center of the city was built in the middle of the 19th century. In Soviet times museum of one book – "Kobzar" by Shevchenko – was opened there.
Castle Hill (Hill of Glory). The memorial complex with a monument "Motherland" is located at the top of the former Castle Hill. At this point, ancient Russian fort, remains of Cherkasy fortress and Holy Trinity Church were situated. In 1977 all architectural and archaeological sites were completely destroyed during construction of the monument, although the new Holy Trinity Cathedral was constructed nearby. From the top of the hill a panoramic view opens on the Kremenchuk Reservoir.
Local History Museum. Cherkasy Oblast museum is housed in a modern building, built in 1985 in the historic center of the city near the Hill of Glory (Castle Hill). Thirty halls of the museum offer sections about nature of the region, archeology, ethnography, history of the region in the 14th – early 20th century, modern history from 1917 to the present. In total there are about 12 thousand exhibits.
Puppet Theatre. Cherkasy Regional Academic Puppet Theater is located in the central part of the city, in a building that is an architectural monument of the 19th century. The building is decorated with mosaics with the heroes of fairy tales.
School of Music. The building of Cherkasy Music School of S. Gulak-Artemovsky was built in 1903 as a men's gymnasium. The author of the project was great Kyiv architect of Polish origin V. Gorodetsky. In the second half of the 20th century, after the construction of a modern extension, the building became the home of a music school.

Notable people

 Anna Asti (born 1990), a Ukrainian pop singer.
 Tykhin Baybuza (16th C.) a Registered Cossacks Senior from 1597 to 1598.
 Olga Bielkova (born 1975) a former Member of the Ukrainian Parliament from 2012 to 2020
 Timofiy Bilohradsky (ca.1710 - ca.1782) a lutenist, composer and kobzar-bandurist from Ukraine
 Samuel Cashwan (1900–1988) an American sculptor.
 Volodymyr Dashkovsky (born 1965) a Ukrainian military conductor and composer 
 Eduard Gudzenko (1938–2006) a Ukrainian expressionist artist. 
 Yuri Ilyenko (1936–2010) film director and screenwriter, directed 12 films between 1965 and 2002.
 Irena Karpa (born 1980) a Ukrainian writer, journalist, and singer.
 Andriy Khlyvnyuk (born 1979) Ukrainian musician, vocalist and lyricist of the group BoomBox.
 Vitalij Kowaljow (born 1968) a bass opera singer, lives in Switzerland.
 Louis Krasner (1903–1995), American classical violinist
 Natalya Lagoda (1974–2015) a Russian–Ukrainian singer, entertainer and model.
 Levi Olan (1903–1984) an American Reform Jewish rabbi, liberal social activist and author.
 Miron Polyakin (1895-1941) Russian and Soviet violinist, disciple of Leopold Auer.
 Bert Ramelson (1910–1994), industrial organiser and politician for the CPGB.
 Oleksandr Skichko (born 1991) Ukrainian politician, comedian, actor and TV presenter.
 Aleksandr Sokiryansky (1937-2019), Soviet Moldavian composer and musicologist.
 Roman Sushchenko (born 1969) a Ukrainian journalist and artist.
 Moisei Uritsky (1873–1918) a Bolshevik revolutionary leader in Russia.
 Semyon Uritsky (1895–1938) a Soviet General, also fought in the Imperial Russian Army
 Lazar Weiner (1897–1982) Imperial Russian-born, American-naturalized composer of Yiddish song.
 Olexiy Yurin (born 1982) Ukrainian poet, pedagogue and interpreter; he lives in Bulgaria.

Sport 
 Nazar Chepurnyi (born 2002), a Ukrainian artistic gymnast.
 Valentin Demyanenko (born 1983) former Ukrainian-born Azerbaijani flat-water canoeist. 
 Artem Dovbyk (born 1997) a footballer with over 120 club caps and 11 for Ukraine
 Serhiy Kulish (born 1993) Ukrainian sport shooter, silver medallist at the 2016 Summer Olympics
 Illia Kovtun (born 2003), a Ukrainian artistic gymnast
 Sviatoslav Mykhailiuk (born 1997), a Ukrainian professional basketball player for the Charlotte Hornets of the National Basketball Association.
 Vitaliy Mykolenko (born 1999) footballer with Everton, over 100 club caps and 26 for Ukraine
 Ihor Stolovytskyi (born 1969) former Soviet and Ukrainian footballer and coach with 510 club caps.
 Stanislav Sukhina (born 1968) a Russian football official and former referee and player.
 Katerina Zhidkova (born 1989), a Ukrainian-born Azerbaijani volleyball player

Twin towns – sister cities

Cherkasy is twinned with:

 Vagharshapat, Armenia
 Bydgoszcz, Poland
 Fergana, Uzbekistan
 Jilin City, China
 Kuşadası, Turkey
 Madaba, Jordan
 Mazyr District, Belarus
 Orsha, Belarus
 Petah Tikva, Israel
 Rustavi, Georgia
 Sumqayit, Azerbaijan
 Wanzhou District, China
 Santa Rosa, California USA

See also 

 List of cities in Ukraine

References

External links 

 Official city portal
Cherkasy guide
 Unofficial info portal
 http://www.gorod.ck.ua/
 Phone book of Cherkasy

Further reading 
 The History of Cities and Villages of the Ukrainian SSR – Cherkasy Oblast), Vol.24. Kiev, 1972.

 
Cities of regional significance in Ukraine
Cherkassky Uyezd
Cossack Hetmanate
Kiev Voivodeship
Populated places on the Dnieper in Ukraine
Oblast centers in Ukraine
Cities in Cherkasy Oblast
1795 establishments in the Russian Empire